The Women's 3 m synchro springboard competition of the 2018 European Aquatics Championships was held on 12 August 2018.

Results
The final was started at 12:30.

References

Women's 3 m synchro springboard